Ender's Shadow (1999) is a parallel science fiction novel by the American author Orson Scott Card, taking place at the same time as the novel Ender's Game and depicting some of the same events from the point of view of Bean, a supporting character in the original novel. It was originally to be titled Urchin, but it was retitled Ender's Shadow prior to release. Ender's Shadow was shortlisted for a Locus Award in 2000.

Plot summary

Bean is a homeless child living on the hellish streets of Rotterdam around 2170 after escaping as an infant from an illegal genetic engineering laboratory. Highly intelligent and extremely young, he is on the brink of dying from starvation, but manages to convince a nine-year-old named Poke to let him join her band of homeless children by offering her an idea. He tells Poke she should recruit an older bully to help fend off other bullies who prevent the younger children from eating at a local soup kitchen. She chooses Achilles, a bully with a bad leg; Bean realizes that Achilles is too intelligent and dangerous a choice, but is unable to change Poke's mind. Achilles is able to manipulate Poke's group, and eventually kills Poke.

Bean's incredible intelligence, creativity and determination bring him to the attention of Sister Carlotta, a nun who is recruiting children for the International Fleet (IF) for a war of survival against the alien Buggers. She gets him admitted to Battle School, despite official resistance and skepticism about his background. Bean has to overcome being much younger and smaller than the other child recruits and faces scrutiny when it is revealed that he scored record highs in all of the school's mental tests. As he proves himself, they constantly compare him to Ender Wiggin, another prodigy who preceded him. Bean begins to ferret out secrets and truths about the school. Meanwhile, Sister Carlotta uncovers Bean's past.

Ender has been chosen as the best chance to save humanity from the Buggers; Bean comes to be the backup in case Ender breaks down. Bean is assigned to draw up the roster for Ender's army. At first, Ender does not appear to recognize Bean's brilliance, but time shows that he was grooming Bean and he finally puts Bean in charge of a special new platoon to handle extraordinary missions. Ender wins combat games against the other, more established school armies; as time goes on, the other side is given more and more unfair advantages, but Ender never loses. Achilles joins Battle School, having also been selected for his intelligence and now with his leg healed. Bean concocts a scheme to trap Achilles and make him confess to multiple murders, including Poke's, revealing that he is a sociopath bent on killing anyone who has seen or made him helpless. The IF arrests Achilles. 

Eventually, Bean and other students graduate from Battle School to work under Ender, who now commands one side in electronically simulated battles; he is told that his foe is Mazer Rackham, the legendary hero who saved humanity from the Second Invasion. However, Bean deduces from various clues that the "simulations" are real battles: Ender and his "jeesh" are commanding human fleets attacking Bugger planets via the Ansible, an instantaneous communications device. The pace increases and the enemy forces become stronger and stronger. Through it all, Ender keeps on winning, but he begins to break down under the pressure; at times, Bean gives the jeesh additional commands. In the final battle at the Buggers' home planet, Ender faces seemingly impossible odds; his only edge is a weapon—"Dr Device"—that can start a chain reaction that destroys matter, but only if the matter is concentrated enough. Ender freezes, unable to come up with a plan, until Bean's prompt (inadvertently) shows him how they can win. With the victory, Ender commits genocide on the Buggers.

Throughout the book, Bean struggles against the IF administration and how they push Ender, seemingly willing to break him to achieve their goals. Bean also has to contend with his past and his struggle to understand what makes Ender human and better than him.

Bean also makes friends with an older boy named Nikolai who is drawn to Bean because of their similar looks. It is soon discovered, through Sister Carlotta's research, that the two boys are genetic twins, except for Bean's genetic enhancements. When Bean was illegally genetically engineered, the scientist Volescu had "turned Anton's Key," meaning that Bean's body—including his brain—will never stop growing, which will result in a premature death between the ages of fifteen and twenty-five. Sister Carlotta ensures that Bean will get to live with Nikolai and his parents after the war. At the end of the story, after they defeat the buggers, Bean is united with his real parents and Nikolai.

Ender's Shadow is the first of a series that includes Shadow of the Hegemon, Shadow Puppets, Shadow of the Giant, Shadows in Flight, and The Last Shadow.

Comics

A five-issue comic book limited series based on Ender's Shadow, called Ender's Shadow: Battle School. was released on December 3, 2008. It was written by Mike Carey, with art by Sebastian Fiumara.

Awards

The novel has received numerous awards, including:
New York Times bestseller (Fiction, 1999)
SF Site Reader's Choice (1999)
Alex Awards (2000)
ALA Best Books for Young Adults (2000)
Geffen Award (Best Translated Science Fiction Book, 2001)
ALA Popular Paperbacks for Young Adults (2004)

Translations
  Chinese: ""
  Czech: ""
  Hebrew: ""
  Dutch: ""
  Polish: ""
  Russian: ""
  Spanish: ""
  Romanian: ""
  French: "" ("The Shadow's Strategy")
  German: ""
  Hungarian: ""
  Korean: ""
  Bulgarian: ""

See also

 List of Ender's Game characters
 List of works by Orson Scott Card

References

External links

 About the novel Ender's Shadow from Card's website
 

1999 American novels
1999 science fiction novels
Ender's Game series books
Tor Books books
Works about child soldiers